Bayelsa International Airport (also known as BIA) is an international airport located at Wilberforce Island, Amassama, Yenagoa, Bayelsa State, located at GPS coordinates: 4°57′46″N 6°12′20″E.

History
The airport was commissioned for construction in 2012 by Bayelsa State ex-Governor Henry Seriake Dickson. The airport had its inaugural flight on 14 February 2019.

The airport was officially commissioned for operation on Monday, 10 February 2020 by the former Governor of Bayelsa State Sen. Henry Seriake Dickson, a year after its inaugural flight.

Bayelsa International Airport was on the 17 April 2021 granted commercial flight operations approval by Nigerian Civil Aviation Authority(NCAA).

Airlines and Destinations

References 

Airports in Nigeria